Exit Plan, also titled Suicide Tourist, is a 2019 Danish-Norwegian-German mystery drama film directed by Jonas Alexander Arnby and starring Nikolaj Coster-Waldau. The film premiered at the 2019 Sitges Film Festival.

Synopsis
Insurance detective Max Isaksen investigates the cold case of Arthur's disappearance. The assignment takes him into the clandestine Aurora Hotel, a secretive facility that specializes in elaborate assisted suicide fantasies. While in the midst of an existential crisis, Max questions his perception of reality.

Cast
Nikolaj Coster-Waldau as Max Isaksen
Tuva Novotny as Lærke
Robert Aramayo as Ari
Jan Bijvoet as Frank
Solbjørg Højfeldt as Karen
Sonja Richter as Alice Dinesen
Lorraine Hilton as Jenny
Slimane Dazi as Francois
Johanna Wokalek as Linda
Kaya Wilkins as Mia
Kate Ashfield as Fake Mother

Release
The film had its world premiere at the Sitges Film Festival on 3 October 2019. It was released in theaters and on VOD in the United States by Screen Media Films on 12 June 2020.

Reception

Box office
Exit Plan grossed $0 in North America and $3,955 in Hungary.

Critical response
The film holds a 38% approval rating on review aggregator Rotten Tomatoes, based on 26 reviews, with a weighted average of 5.20/10. The website's critical consensus reads, "A would-be thriller that leans a little too hard into its hero's existential crisis, Exit Plan will leave most viewers looking for the door." On Metacritic, it holds a rating of 46 out of 100, based on 11 critics, indicating "mixed or average reviews". Lorry Kikta of Film Threat awarded the film a 10 out of 10.  Hannah Hoolihan of Screen Rant awarded the film two and a half stars out of five.  Tara McNamara of Common Sense Media awarded the film three stars out of five. Frank Scheck of The Hollywood Reporter gave the film a negative review and wrote, "Exit Plan plays like an existential thriller that unfortunately lacks both philosophical depth and thrills." Dennis Harvey of Variety also gave the film a negative review, describing it as "a movie that’s ultimately a little too polite and vague to make much of its intriguing premise." Glenn Kenny of RogerEbert.com awarded the film two stars and wrote, "And Coster-Waldau commits to his dull character sufficiently to be, well, dull." Katie Walsh of the Los Angeles Times also gave the film a negative review and wrote, "There is real potential in this premise, and a few flickers of genuine artfulness, but the storytelling is frustratingly abstruse, making for an Exit Plan that’s a real missed opportunity."

References

External links
 
 
 

2010s English-language films
English-language Danish films
English-language Norwegian films
English-language German films
2010s Danish-language films
German mystery drama films
2019 drama films
2019 films
2019 multilingual films
Danish multilingual films
Norwegian multilingual films
German multilingual films
2010s German films